Orhan is a Turkish given name for males and a surname. People with the name include:

First name
 Orhan (1281–1362), Turkish Ottoman sultan
 Orhan Ademi (born 1991), Swiss footballer
 Orhan Aksoy, multiple people
 Orhan Aytür (born 1965), Turkish World champion amateur underwater photographer
 Orhan Birgit (1927–2019), Turkish lawyer, politician and journalist
 Orhan Boran (1928–2012), Turkish radio and TV host
 Orhan Çıkırıkçı (born 1967), Turkish footballer
 Orhan Çelebi (1412–1453), Ottoman prince
 Orhan Demir (born 1954), Canadian jazz guitarist of Turkish origin
 Orhan Džepar (born 1996), Dutch football player
 Orhan Eyüpoğlu (1918–1980), Turkish politician
 Orhan Gencebay (born 1944), Turkish musician
 Orhan Gülle (born 1992), Turkish footballer
 Orhan Karaveli (born 1930), Turkish journalist and writer
 Orhan Kemal (1914–1970), Turkish novelist
 Orhan Miroğlu (born 1953), Turkish politician
 Orhan Mustafi (born 1990), Albanian footballer
 Orhan Pamuk (born 1952), Nobel-winning Turkish novelist

Middle name
 Asım Orhan Barut (1926–1994), Turkish-American theoretical physicist

Surname
 Çekdar Orhan (born 1998), Turkish football player
 Mahmut Orhan (born 1993), Turkish musical artist
 Yılmaz Orhan (born 1955), Cypriot football player

Other uses
 , powership

Turkish masculine given names
Turkish-language surnames